The 1961–62 New York Rangers season was the franchise's 36th season. During the regular season, the Rangers finished fourth in the NHL with 64 points, and qualified for the playoffs. In the NHL semi-finals, the Rangers lost to the Toronto Maple Leafs in six games.

Regular season

Final standings

Record vs. opponents

Schedule and results

|- align="center" bgcolor="#CCFFCC"
| 1 || 11 || @ Boston Bruins || 6–2 || 1–0–0
|- align="center" bgcolor="#CCFFCC"
| 2 || 12 || Boston Bruins || 6–3 || 2–0–0
|- align="center" bgcolor="#FFBBBB"
| 3 || 14 || @ Montreal Canadiens || 3–1 || 2–1–0
|- align="center" bgcolor="#CCFFCC"
| 4 || 15 || Toronto Maple Leafs || 2–1 || 3–1–0
|- align="center" bgcolor="#FFBBBB"
| 5 || 18 || Montreal Canadiens || 5–2 || 3–2–0
|- align="center" bgcolor="#CCFFCC"
| 6 || 19 || @ Chicago Black Hawks || 4–2 || 4–2–0
|- align="center" bgcolor="white"
| 7 || 21 || @ Detroit Red Wings || 4–4 || 4–2–1
|- align="center" bgcolor="#FFBBBB"
| 8 || 22 || Detroit Red Wings || 5–4 || 4–3–1
|- align="center" bgcolor="white"
| 9 || 25 || Chicago Black Hawks || 1–1 || 4–3–2
|- align="center" bgcolor="#FFBBBB"
| 10 || 28 || @ Toronto Maple Leafs || 5–1 || 4–4–2
|- align="center" bgcolor="#CCFFCC"
| 11 || 29 || Toronto Maple Leafs || 4–2 || 5–4–2
|- align="center" bgcolor="#CCFFCC"
| 12 || 31 || @ Chicago Black Hawks || 4–2 || 6–4–2
|-

|- align="center" bgcolor="#FFBBBB"
| 13 || 2 || @ Detroit Red Wings || 1–0 || 6–5–2
|- align="center" bgcolor="white"
| 14 || 4 || @ Montreal Canadiens || 3–3 || 6–5–3
|- align="center" bgcolor="white"
| 15 || 8 || Boston Bruins || 4–4 || 6–5–4
|- align="center" bgcolor="#CCFFCC"
| 16 || 12 || Chicago Black Hawks || 4–1 || 7–5–4
|- align="center" bgcolor="white"
| 17 || 18 || Montreal Canadiens || 4–4 || 7–5–5
|- align="center" bgcolor="#CCFFCC"
| 18 || 19 || Toronto Maple Leafs || 5–3 || 8–5–5
|- align="center" bgcolor="#CCFFCC"
| 19 || 22 || Detroit Red Wings || 4–0 || 9–5–5
|- align="center" bgcolor="#CCFFCC"
| 20 || 23 || @ Boston Bruins || 4–3 || 10–5–5
|- align="center" bgcolor="#FFBBBB"
| 21 || 25 || @ Toronto Maple Leafs || 6–0 || 10–6–5
|- align="center" bgcolor="white"
| 22 || 26 || Montreal Canadiens || 2–2 || 10–6–6
|-

|- align="center" bgcolor="#FFBBBB"
| 23 || 2 || @ Boston Bruins || 3–1 || 10–7–6
|- align="center" bgcolor="#CCFFCC"
| 24 || 3 || Boston Bruins || 3–1 || 11–7–6
|- align="center" bgcolor="#FFBBBB"
| 25 || 6 || Chicago Black Hawks || 8–3 || 11–8–6
|- align="center" bgcolor="white"
| 26 || 7 || @ Detroit Red Wings || 3–3 || 11–8–7
|- align="center" bgcolor="white"
| 27 || 9 || @ Montreal Canadiens || 2–2 || 11–8–8
|- align="center" bgcolor="#FFBBBB"
| 28 || 10 || Toronto Maple Leafs || 3–2 || 11–9–8
|- align="center" bgcolor="#FFBBBB"
| 29 || 16 || @ Toronto Maple Leafs || 4–2 || 11–10–8
|- align="center" bgcolor="#FFBBBB"
| 30 || 17 || @ Chicago Black Hawks || 3–1 || 11–11–8
|- align="center" bgcolor="#CCFFCC"
| 31 || 20 || Detroit Red Wings || 6–1 || 12–11–8
|- align="center" bgcolor="#CCFFCC"
| 32 || 23 || Chicago Black Hawks || 7–3 || 13–11–8
|- align="center" bgcolor="#CCFFCC"
| 33 || 25 || @ Detroit Red Wings || 6–4 || 14–11–8
|- align="center" bgcolor="#FFBBBB"
| 34 || 27 || Montreal Canadiens || 3–0 || 14–12–8
|- align="center" bgcolor="#FFBBBB"
| 35 || 31 || Boston Bruins || 7–4 || 14–13–8
|-

|- align="center" bgcolor="#CCFFCC"
| 36 || 1 || @ Boston Bruins || 4–2 || 15–13–8
|- align="center" bgcolor="#FFBBBB"
| 37 || 3 || @ Chicago Black Hawks || 2–1 || 15–14–8
|- align="center" bgcolor="#FFBBBB"
| 38 || 6 || @ Montreal Canadiens || 5–1 || 15–15–8
|- align="center" bgcolor="#FFBBBB"
| 39 || 7 || Toronto Maple Leafs || 4–3 || 15–16–8
|- align="center" bgcolor="#FFBBBB"
| 40 || 13 || @ Chicago Black Hawks || 4–2 || 15–17–8
|- align="center" bgcolor="#FFBBBB"
| 41 || 14 || @ Detroit Red Wings || 2–1 || 15–18–8
|- align="center" bgcolor="#FFBBBB"
| 42 || 17 || @ Toronto Maple Leafs || 4–2 || 15–19–8
|- align="center" bgcolor="#FFBBBB"
| 43 || 21 || @ Chicago Black Hawks || 3–1 || 15–20–8
|- align="center" bgcolor="#FFBBBB"
| 44 || 24 || Detroit Red Wings || 3–0 || 15–21–8
|- align="center" bgcolor="#FFBBBB"
| 45 || 27 || @ Montreal Canadiens || 5–1 || 15–22–8
|- align="center" bgcolor="#FFBBBB"
| 46 || 28 || Chicago Black Hawks || 3–0 || 15–23–8
|- align="center" bgcolor="#CCFFCC"
| 47 || 31 || Boston Bruins || 5–0 || 16–23–8
|-

|- align="center" bgcolor="#CCFFCC"
| 48 || 1 || @ Boston Bruins || 5–3 || 17–23–8
|- align="center" bgcolor="#FFBBBB"
| 49 || 3 || @ Toronto Maple Leafs || 4–1 || 17–24–8
|- align="center" bgcolor="#CCFFCC"
| 50 || 4 || Montreal Canadiens || 2–1 || 18–24–8
|- align="center" bgcolor="white"
| 51 || 7 || Detroit Red Wings || 2–2 || 18–24–9
|- align="center" bgcolor="#CCFFCC"
| 52 || 10 || Chicago Black Hawks || 2–1 || 19–24–9
|- align="center" bgcolor="#CCFFCC"
| 53 || 11 || @ Boston Bruins || 5–3 || 20–24–9
|- align="center" bgcolor="#FFBBBB"
| 54 || 14 || @ Chicago Black Hawks || 4–3 || 20–25–9
|- align="center" bgcolor="#FFBBBB"
| 55 || 15 || @ Detroit Red Wings || 4–3 || 20–26–9
|- align="center" bgcolor="#FFBBBB"
| 56 || 17 || @ Toronto Maple Leafs || 5–3 || 20–27–9
|- align="center" bgcolor="#CCFFCC"
| 57 || 18 || Toronto Maple Leafs || 6–2 || 21–27–9
|- align="center" bgcolor="#CCFFCC"
| 58 || 21 || Boston Bruins || 4–2 || 22–27–9
|- align="center" bgcolor="#FFBBBB"
| 59 || 24 || @ Montreal Canadiens || 4–2 || 22–28–9
|- align="center" bgcolor="white"
| 60 || 25 || Montreal Canadiens || 3–3 || 22–28–10
|- align="center" bgcolor="white"
| 61 || 28 || Boston Bruins || 2–2 || 22–28–11
|-

|- align="center" bgcolor="#FFBBBB"
| 62 || 3 || @ Toronto Maple Leafs || 3–1 || 22–29–11
|- align="center" bgcolor="#FFBBBB"
| 63 || 4 || Detroit Red Wings || 4–2 || 22–30–11
|- align="center" bgcolor="#CCFFCC"
| 64 || 6 || @ Detroit Red Wings || 5–4 || 23–30–11
|- align="center" bgcolor="#FFBBBB"
| 65 || 11 || Montreal Canadiens || 2–1 || 23–31–11
|- align="center" bgcolor="#CCFFCC"
| 66 || 14 || Detroit Red Wings || 3–2 || 24–31–11
|- align="center" bgcolor="#FFBBBB"
| 67 || 17 || @ Montreal Canadiens || 2–0 || 24–32–11
|- align="center" bgcolor="white"
| 68 || 18 || Toronto Maple Leafs || 2–2 || 24–32–12
|- align="center" bgcolor="#CCFFCC"
| 69 || 22 || @ Boston Bruins || 4–3 || 25–32–12
|- align="center" bgcolor="#CCFFCC"
| 70 || 25 || Chicago Black Hawks || 4–1 || 26–32–12
|-

Playoffs

Key:  Win  Loss

Player statistics
Skaters

Goaltenders

†Denotes player spent time with another team before joining Rangers. Stats reflect time with Rangers only.
‡Traded mid-season. Stats reflect time with Rangers only.

Awards and records

Transactions

See also
1961–62 NHL season

References

New York Rangers seasons
New York Rangers
New York Rangers
New York Rangers
New York Rangers
Madison Square Garden
1960s in Manhattan